Elisa Trevisan (born 5 March 1980) is a former Italian female heptathlete.

Biography
She finished 24th at the 2006 European Championships and has won five times at the Italian Athletics Championships. She has had ten caps for the national team.

Progression
Heptathlon

Achievements

National titles
She won five times the national championships.
Italian Athletics Championships
Heptathlon: 2005, 2006, 2007, 2011, 2012

See also
 Italian all-time lists - Heptathlon

References

External links
 

1980 births
Living people
Italian female pentathletes
Italian heptathletes
People from Castelfranco Veneto
Athletics competitors of Fiamme Azzurre
Competitors at the 2007 Summer Universiade
Sportspeople from the Province of Treviso
21st-century Italian women